Kennedy Lake Provincial Park is a provincial park in British Columbia, Canada located on the SW side of Kennedy Lake, SE of Tofino, British Columbia adjacent to the Pacific Rim National Park Reserve.  The park has day use facilities only.

See also
Clayoquot Sound Biosphere Reserve

References

External links

Provincial parks of British Columbia
Clayoquot Sound region
1995 establishments in British Columbia
Protected areas established in 1995